The 1986 Intercontinental Cup was an association football match played on 14 December 1986 between River Plate of Argentina, winners of the 1986 Copa Libertadores, and Steaua București of Romania, winners of the 1985–86 European Cup. The match was played in front of 62,000 fans at the neutral venue of the National Stadium in Tokyo. Antonio Alzamendi was named as man of the match and scored the only goal of the game in the 28th minute when he headed into the net after his initial shot had hit the post and then came back off the goalkeeper.

Match details

|valign="top" width="50%"|

|}

See also
1985–86 European Cup
1986 Copa Libertadores
FC Steaua București in European football

References

External links

FIFA Article
Final details @ labtof

Intercontinental Cup
i
i
Intercontinental Cup
Intercontinental Cup (football)
Intercontinental Cup (football) matches hosted by Japan
i
i
i
i
Sports competitions in Tokyo
Intercontinental Cup
Intercontinental Cup
Intercontinental Cup